Sphaenorhynchus botocudo is a frog in the family Hylidae endemic to Brazil.

The adult male frog measures 23.9-29.3 mm in snout-vent length.  It has a black line from the nose to each eye and a white spot under each eye.  It has a white stripe outlined in brown from each eye to the groin.

References

Species described in 2009
Frogs of South America
botocudo